The Valencia Subdivision Residential District is a historic district in Rockledge, Florida. On August 21, 1992, it was added to the U.S. National Register of Historic Places.

References

External links
Brevard County listings at National Register of Historic Places

Houses in Brevard County, Florida
National Register of Historic Places in Brevard County, Florida
Historic districts on the National Register of Historic Places in Florida
1992 establishments in Florida